Per August Gustafsson (4 November 1875 – 31 October 1938) was a Swedish policeman who won a gold medal in the tug of war competition at the 1912 Summer Olympics.

References

1875 births
1938 deaths
Tug of war competitors at the 1912 Summer Olympics
Olympic tug of war competitors of Sweden
Olympic gold medalists for Sweden
Olympic medalists in tug of war
Medalists at the 1912 Summer Olympics